Berlin-Neukölln is an electoral constituency (German: Wahlkreis) represented in the Bundestag. It elects one member via first-past-the-post voting. Under the current constituency numbering system, it is designated as constituency 82. It is located in southern Berlin, comprising the Neukölln borough.

Berlin-Neukölln was created for the inaugural 1990 federal election after German reunification. Since 2021, it has been represented by Hakan Demir of the Social Democratic Party (SPD).

Geography
Berlin-Neukölln is located in southern Berlin. As of the 2021 federal election, it is coterminous with the Neukölln borough.

History
Berlin-Neukölln was created after German reunification in 1990. In the 1990 election, it was constituency 256 in the numbering system. In the 1994 and 1998 elections, it was number 257. In the 2005 through 2009 elections, it was number 83. Since the 2013 election, it has been number 82. Its borders have not changed since its creation.

Members
The constituency was first represented by Dankward Buwitt of the Christian Democratic Union (CDU) from 1990 to 1998. It was won by the Social Democratic Party (SPD) in 1998 and represented by Ditmar Staffelt. In 2009, Stefanie Vogelsang of the CDU was elected, and served a single term. Fritz Felgentreu regained the constituency for the SPD in the 2013 election, and was re-elected in 2017. He was succeeded by Hakan Demir in 2021.

Election results

2021 election

2017 election

2013 election

2009 election

References

Neukölln
Federal electoral districts in Berlin
1990 establishments in Germany
Constituencies established in 1990